is a 1990 Japanese film directed by Shinji Sōmai. It stars Kiichi Nakai and Riho Makise, marking the latter's debut film appearance.

Premise
Yuu Kamiya, a young model, is killed in a traffic accident. Her death is covered up by Shirayuki, an executive in the modeling business. In heaven, Yuu is given the chance to return to earth on the condition that she cannot come in contact with anyone who knows that she has died. She decides to start her life over from scratch, becoming romantically involved with her former manager Fumio Amemiya, but things go awry when Shirayuki announces her death and plans a memorial service for her.

Cast
 Kiichi Nakai as Fumio Amemiya
 Riho Makise as Yuu Kamiya
 Shōfukutei Tsurube II as Shirayuki

Home media
In August 2021, the film was released on Blu-ray in Japan.

References

External links
 

1990 films
1990s Japanese films
1990 drama films
Japanese drama films
Films about the afterlife
Films about modeling